Española Valley High School (EVHS) is a Title-1 public senior high school of the Española Public Schools District, located in Española, New Mexico. Nearly 3/4 of the student body is made up of Hispanic students.

The school is located within the city limits in Fairview, a small suburb community in the southern part of Rio Arriba County. EVHS also serves the communities of Alcalde, Velarde as well as the northern part of Santa Fe County, including Chimayo, Santa Cruz, and Sombrillo. EVHS also attracts commuter students from other school districts and neighboring towns such as Dixon, Pojoaque and Santa Fe. For 2016–17, the student enrollment was 1,150 students.

The school's athletic teams are referred to as the Sundevils, which is also the school's mascot.

History

Española was founded with the introduction of the railroads in 1880; with the railroads came an influx in population, private education existed until 1905, when the county saw a demand for public education. Two high schools opened, Santa Cruz High School just right out outside of Española in 1908, and Española High School opened in downtown in 1920. The schools were located on opposite sides of the Rio Grande.

Although both schools were operated by the same school district, administrators believed merger of schools was cost effective and the best decision for the city. Months later construction of EVHS school began, the location for the new school was on the El Llano mesa, on Española's east side. Doors opened to 10–12th graders in the fall semester of 1975 to over 950 students. The first graduating class was 1976, Merce Villareal was the first principal.

While the new campus was under construction sporting events remained at the old Española High School due to a lack of funds. In 1979 a new sports complex was finally complete at the new high school campus along with the gymnasium, known today as Edward Medina Gymnasium.

Service area
In addition to Española, it serves:
Sections of Rio Arriba County, including: Abiquiu, Alcalde, Canova, Chamita, Chili, Dixon, El Duende, Hernandez, La Mesilla, La Villita, Los Luceros, Lyden, Medanales, Ohkay Owingeh, Pueblito, San Jose, Santa Clara Pueblo, Velarde, and a portion of Ojo Sarco
Sections of Santa Fe County, including Chimayo, La Puebla, Rio Chiquito, Santa Cruz, Sombrillo, and a portion of El Valle de Arroyo Seco

Academics

At Espanola Valley High School, Advanced Placement (AP) courses are offered at EVHS in almost every subject. There are over 27 elective classes offered to students including concurrent enrollment at Northern New Mexico College.

Students of EVHS are on an individualized four–year otherwise known as the "Next–Step plan" due to standards-based curriculum set up by the district and state. Since 2011, a student is required 24 credit hours to graduate from EVHS, previously only 23 were needed.

Awards

Torch award

EVHS Students who have earned a 3.5 GPA yearly and involved in extracurricular activities (including athletics), can apply and are considered for the award. The Torch award is the most prestigious honorary award of its kind at EVHS. The award was created by former principal Bruce Hopmeier in 2005.

State testing

NMPED state assessment 

The New Mexico Public Education Department (NMPED) replaced the "No Child Left Behind Act" and AYP testing with a new school grading formula, which took effect for the 2010–11 school year. The grade is calculated using many forms of testing, and includes graduation rates.

Administration and student body

Principals

Student statistics

Extracurricular activities

Athletics program

Española Valley High School competes in the New Mexico Activities Association, they are classified as a 5A school in District 2 along with: Albuquerque Academy, Capital High School, Del Norte High School and Los Alamos High School.

Throughout its history, Espanola Valley competed in 4A (until early 2014), capturing three state championships in various sports, and eleven individual state champions. In 2007, the school set a New Mexico High School record for major NCAA scholarships for 10 graduating seniors. In 1989 and 2002 the school was voted by the NMAA with the Sportsmanship Award.

Boys basketball 

The Sundevils captured the state title in the 2011 season as the #2 seed, defeating Goddard High School (55–52).

In 2016, EVHS won its second basketball title, defeating rival Capital High School (36–34) as the #4 seed.

Rivalries 
EVHS has maintained a rivalry with Los Alamos High School in most competitive sports since opening. Other rivals include Capital High School for basketball.

State championships

{| class="wikitable " width=
|+
! colspan="4" | NMAA State Championships
|-
! Season !! Sport !! Number || Champions 
|-
|Fall ||  Cross Country, Girls || align="center"|1 || 1992 
|-
| rowspan="3"|Winter || Basketball, Boys ||  align="center"|2  || 2016, 2011 
|-
| Spirit/Cheer || align="center"|1 || 1995 
|-
| Bowling, Boys ||  align="center"|1  || 2022
|- 
| align="center" colspan="2"|Total || align="center"|5
|-
|}

Music program

Band

Española Valley High's Band "Sound of Northern New Mexico", led by Robert Felix, was nationally renowned. Throughout the 1980s the band attended many competitions, including many college bowl games. In 1984, the Band attended the Tournament of Roses Parade in Pasadena, California, the band was sent an invitation from the committee, a first for the parade. EVHS is only 1 out of 4 schools in New Mexico to attend and march in the Rose Parade.

Mariachi
In the late 1990s the marching band at Española Valley dissolved. Music teacher Alfonso Trujillo started a small mariachi band as an elective class. The group "Mariachi Sol del Valle" performed for local events for several years. In 2008 when Presidential candidate Barack Obama stopped in Espanola for a campaign rally the band performed in the event. Months later the schools band received an invitation from out of 1,400 schools throughout the country to be a participant in the 2009 Presidential inaugural parade in Washington, D.C.

Student organizations
There are over 45 clubs, organizations and extracurricular activities at EVHS, Most notable are the Supercomputing Challenge, which has received many awards from state competitions, M.E.S.A, "The Sundevil Torch", the school's official student run newspaper,"The Diablo del Sol", the school's yearbook, Student School Improvement team, and the Student Council.

Student Council
The EVHS Student Council is a member of the New Mexico Association of Student Councils (NMASC), it attends their state conferences every year.

During the 2013–14 and 2015–16 school years, EVHS students were elected as the State President. Additionally, an EVHS student served the NMASC as State Secretary from 2011–12. In the fall of 2011, the EVHS Student Council was selected to be the host school for the annual conference and hosted the 2014 NMASC State Conference, that year EVHS won the Gold Council award.

Notable alumni
 Leo Jaramillo, member-elect of the New Mexico Senate
 Debbie Rodella, former member of the New Mexico House of Representatives
 Levi Romero, poet and academic (attended)

References

External links 
 
 

Educational institutions established in 1975
Public high schools in New Mexico
Schools in Rio Arriba County, New Mexico
Española, New Mexico